Dorcadion zanteanum is a species of beetle in the family Cerambycidae. It was described by Breuning and Villiers in 1967.

References

zanteanum
Beetles described in 1967